John Connors (born 1990) is an Irish Traveller actor, screenwriter, and documentary filmmaker and playwright best known for his role as Patrick Ward in the Irish crime drama series Love/Hate, for which he was nominated for best-supporting actor at the 2016 Irish film and television awards, and for Cardboard Gangsters, for which he won Best Actor at the 2018 Irish film and television awards.

Connors was born in 1990 in London, United Kingdom to an Irish traveller family, and moved to Ireland with his family when he was 11 months old. His father suffered from depression and schizophrenia, and killed himself when Connors was eight years old. Connors took up acting when he was 20 years old after being persuaded by his younger brother Joseph, in a bid to help him with his own battle with depression. Connors began boxing at a young age because he was experiencing bullying. He is a former three-time Irish boxing champion and a four nations boxing gold medalist and was picked by the Herald newspaper for their ‘Future Star’ segment at fifteen years old.

In 2017 he was named in the fifty incredible people who are shaping Ireland by the Irish Independent and he was also named as one of the "twenty twenty-somethings that could influence Ireland and the world" by The Irish Times.

He appeared on an episode of the series Livin' with Lucy (Virgin Media) with Lucy Kennedy, in 2019. Connors won the 2018 IFTA for best actor for his performance in the film Cardboard Gangsters, which Connors also wrote. In his victory speech, Connors criticised the Irish Film Board for not supporting the film, before he talked about his battle with mental health and how acting saved his life. He dedicated the award to his late father. The speech went viral, gaining millions of hits online. Three months later his documentary series, John Connors: The Travellers, won the 2018 IFTA for best documentary series. In the documentary Connors called on the Irish government to formally recognise Travellers as a distinct Irish indigenous ethnic minority, which happened later that year. In his speech, he criticised successive Irish governments for assimilation policies and institutionalised discrimination against Irish Travellers. He also accused the Dún Laoghaire–Rathdown County Council of murder through negligence of the eleven members of the Connors and Lynch Traveller families, eleven of whom died in the Carrickmines fire tragedy in October 2015. Connors's directorial feature documentary debut, Endless Sunshine on a Cloudy Day, won the audience award at the 2020 Dublin International Film Festival.

Activism
Connors has spoken out about Travellers' rights and against racism and depression, appearing a number of times on The Late Late Show on RTÉ. His first appearance on The Late Late Show caused controversy. Connors was promoting his documentary I am Traveller. When talking about the bigotry and hardship Travellers experience day to day in Ireland the host Ryan Turbidy asked "Do you not think you're sounding a bit like a victim" to which Connors replied "See Ryan you and me live in different worlds. My world has shaped me in such a way that I have the ability look past stereotypes, question popular opinion, think for myself and have empathy for people who have it hard or are experiencing injustice. You live in a comfortable bubble. Enjoy it." RTE were flooded with complaints as to how the host conducted the interview. The interview and the documentary created a national conversation about discrimination against Travellers.

Connors is anti-abortion and supported a 'No' vote in the 2018 Irish abortion referendum. Following his call for a 'No' vote, he alleged that he was the target of anti-Traveller racism. In response to protests held in Dublin in June 2020 after the death of African American man George Floyd in Minneapolis, Connors questioned whether the same 'anti-racist solidarity' would be shown for Irish Travellers.

In July 2020, Connors called for the resignation of the newly appointed Minister for Children, Equality, Disability, Integration and Youth, Roderic O'Gorman, after a photo taken at 2018 Dublin Pride of O'Gorman alongside British gay rights activist Peter Tatchell emerged, controversial for his advocacy of lowering the age of consent.  O'Gorman stated "I met Peter Tatchell once and took a photo. This was the only time I have met him. I knew of him as someone who stood up for LGBT people in countries where their rights were threatened. I was surprised to read some of his quotes from the 90s, which I had not read before. Any of those views would be completely abhorrent to me." Connors accused Tatchell of being a paedophile apologist. He called for O'Gorman to resign during a speech at a protest held outside Leinster House on 11 July. On 19 July, Connors published a full apology to Roderic O'Gorman, stating that he had been "politically naive" and contributed to "hurtful and false assertions" about the TD: "What is difficult for me to accept is that my own misguided anger led me to appear to feed an army of trolls and support groups whose views I find repugnant, whose politics are rotten and whose methods are ugly." O'Gorman said he accepted the apology and considered the issue resolved.

Filmography

Film

Television

Awards and nominations

References 

Living people
1990 births
Male actors from Dublin (city)
Irish Travellers from England